Never Too Late is a 1935 American crime film directed by Bernard B. Ray and stars Richard Talmadge, Thelma White and Robert Frazer.

Plot

Cast
 Richard Talmadge as Det. Dick Manning 
 Thelma White as Helen Lloyd 
 Robert Frazer as Commissioner George Hartley 
 Mildred Harris as Marie Lloyd Hartley 
 Vera Lewis as Mother Hartley 
 Robert Walker as Matt Dunning - Henchman bidding at auction 
 George Chesebro as Dude Hannigan - Second Henchman At Auction 
 Bull Montana as Monte, an escaped convict 
 Paul Ellis as Lavelle, the jewel thief 
 Lloyd Ingraham as Chief of Detectives Winter

References

Bibliography
 Pitts, Michael R. Poverty Row Studios, 1929–1940: An Illustrated History of 55 Independent Film Companies, with a Filmography for Each. McFarland & Company, 2005.

External links
 
 
 
 

1935 films
1935 crime films
American crime films
Films directed by Bernard B. Ray
Reliable Pictures films
American black-and-white films
1930s English-language films
1930s American films
English-language crime films